2012–13 Raiffeisen Superliga was the fourteenth season of top-tier football in Kosovo. The campaign began on 1 August 2012, and ended on 2 June 2013.

Stadiums and locations

League table

Results

Matches 1–22

Matches 23–33

Relegation play-offs

References

External links 
 Tabelle auf ffk-kosova.com
 Tabelle und Ergebnisse auf albaniasoccer.com

Football Superleague of Kosovo seasons
Kosovo
1